Sŏn'gyo-guyŏk or Songyo District is one of the 18 guyŏk that constitute  the city of Pyongyang, North Korea.  It is on the eastern bank of the Taedong River at the center of East Pyongyang.  It is bordered to the south by Nakrang-guyok, to the north by Tongdaewon-guyok and to the east by Ryokpo and Sadong-guyoks.  It was established in September 1959.

Administrative divisions
Songyo-guyok is divided into nine administrative districts known as dong. Most of the districts are further divided into separate numbered sections for administrative purposes.

References

Districts of Pyongyang